Zoran Stoinović (born 26 July 1975) is a retired Serbian football player.

Stoinović spent most of his professional career in Greece, appearing in just 31 Alpha Ethniki matches for Aris Thessaloniki, Trikala and Panachaiki. He played in the Beta Ethniki and Gamma Ethniki for several clubs, including Iraklis Ptolemaidas, Panetolikos and Patraikos. He also had a spell with OFK Beograd in the First League of Serbia and Montenegro.

References

1975 births
Living people
Serbian footballers
OFK Beograd players
Trikala F.C. players
Aris Thessaloniki F.C. players
Panetolikos F.C. players
Patraikos F.C. players
Panachaiki F.C. players
Levadiakos F.C. players
Panthrakikos F.C. players
Serbian expatriate footballers
Expatriate footballers in Greece
Serbian expatriate sportspeople in Greece
Association football midfielders